Military advisors or combat advisors are military personnel deployed to advise on military matters. The term is often used for soldiers sent to foreign countries to aid such countries' militaries with their military education and training, organization, and other various military tasks. The foreign powers or organizations may send such soldiers to support countries or insurgencies while minimizing the risks of potential casualties and avoiding the political ramifications of overtly mobilizing military forces to aid an ally.

European advisors during the American Revolution
The French Marquis de Lafayette and the Prussian Baron von Steuben offered key assistance to the Continental Army during the American Revolutionary War of 1775–1783.

Soviet military advisors 

The Soviet Union deployed military advisors in (for example) Spain, China and Angola, where "The 1976 treaty of friendship and cooperation provided for Soviet-Angolan military cooperation in strengthening the mutual defense capacity. Moscow immediately provided weaponry and supplies, and some 500 military advisors."

In China, the "Soviet Union ..sent about 1500 military advisors ..during this period [1937-39]. Included were some of the red Army's best officers [...] Georgii Zhukov [...] Vasilii I. Chuikov [...] P.F. Batitsky [...] Andrey A. Vlasov [...]. Like Spain, China served as a training ground for Soviet officers."

United Kingdom military advisors 

T. E. Lawrence ("Lawrence of Arabia") became arguably the archetypal British military advisor due to his guerrilla role (1916–1918) in the Arab Revolt.

United States military advisors
 Developing capabilities and increasing capacity through advising is an operation the U.S. Army has conducted for more than one hundred years. The Army has performed advisory missions to increase the capability and capacity of foreign militaries from the Philippine Insurrection at the beginning of the 20th century to more recent conflicts in Vietnam, Iraq and Afghanistan.

U.S. advisors in Vietnam

In the early 1960s elements of the U.S. Army Special Forces and Echo 31 went to South Vietnam as military advisors to train and assist the South Vietnamese Army (ARVN) for impending actions against the North Vietnamese People's Army of Vietnam (PAVN).  United States Marines also filled a significant role as advisors to Vietnamese forces.

U.S. advisors during the War on Terror
Combat advisors served during the U.S. war on terror. They were designated as Embedded Training Teams (ETTs) in Afghanistan and as Military Transition Teams (MTTs) in Iraq. These soldiers and Marines live with their Afghan and Iraqi counterparts (often in very austere and stoic conditions) in remote combat outposts often a great distance away from any U.S. or coalition support.

ETTs and MTTs are composed primarily of United States Army, National Guard, and Marine Corps personnel with a combat-arms background. United States Army Reserve, United States Air Force and United States Navy personnel serve as advisors in logistics and other support roles. The advisors on the ground in infantry or commando units of the ANA (Afghan National Army) or the Iraqi Army are soldiers or Marines with combat-arms experience. Special Forces and Navy SEALS also work with ANA/ASF or with the Iraqi Army, but the bulk of combat advisors are infantry and combat-arms soldiers and Marines.

The Combat Advisor Mission Defined. The combat advisor mission requires US officers and NCOs to teach, coach and mentor host nation (HN) security force counterparts. This enables the rapid development of our counterparts' leadership capabilities; helps develop command and control (C2) and operational capabilities at every echelon; allows direct access to Coalition Forces (CF) enablers to enhance HN security force counterinsurgency (COIN) operations; and incorporates CF lethal and nonlethal effects on the battlefield.

Security Forces Assistance (SFA) defines a more in-depth method of embedded mentorship. MTTs have fallen into disuse with shifts in focus and doctrine. Specifically, previous MTTs were drawn from soldiers from separate units, often on an ad hoc basis. SFATs, on the other hand, provide all personnel from organic, modular Brigade Combat Teams rather than supplying personnel piece-meal from various Army units. By design, these teams are manned by a company command team and selected leaders from one command. This SFAT concept has been in place since 2012, with a "by, with and through" method of combat advising. Current Advisory Teams are trained at Fort Polk, Louisiana at the Advisor Academy, "Tigerland".

See also

 Foreign Internal Defense
 Embedded Training Team
 Military Transition Team
 Military Assistance Command, Vietnam
 Chinh–Hunnicutt affair
 Prince Rupert of the Rhine (1619–1682)
 Tadeusz Kościuszko (1746–1817)
 Jean Victor Marie Moreau (1763–1813)
 Charles François Dumouriez (1739–1823)
 Giuseppe Garibaldi (1807–1882)
 Dmitry Pavlov (1897–1941)
 Cuban intervention in Angola (1975–1991)
 Nicaraguan Revolution (1978–1990)
 Salvadoran Civil War (1979–1992)
 United States invasion of Grenada (1983)
 Group of Belarusian military specialists in Venezuela (2008–2013)

References 

Military advisors
Combat occupations